The Pennsylvania Intercollegiate Football Association, or PIFA, was organized on February 28, 1891, and was dissolved within a year.

Conference members 
Six colleges from Pennsylvania formed the PIFA.
 University at Lewisburg (now Bucknell)
 Dickinson
 Franklin & Marshall
 Haverford
 Penn State
 Swarthmore

1891 season 

Penn State was awarded the 1891 championship. Their record was 4–1 in Association play with the loss being at Bucknell (10–12). However, Bucknell lost at Franklin & Marshall (6–12) and tied at Dickinson (0–0) for a record of 3–1–1.

See also
 List of defunct college football conferences

References 

 Prato, Lou, “The Penn State Football Encyclopedia,” Sports Publishing, Champaign, IL, 1998.

 
Defunct college sports conferences in the United States
American football in Pennsylvania
College sports in Pennsylvania
1891 establishments in Pennsylvania
Sports leagues established in 1891